Khullar is a Punjabi Khatri clan in India.

Khullars are actually descendants of sage in the Himalayas some 1200 years back. They are all offspring of a sage called Gomas Rishi. Later on they have scattered at different places all around the world.

According to other information available, Some Khullars have migrated from Kabul Afghanistan and now mostly are based in Samrala, Machiwara and Firozepur (Punjab, India).

Prior to the partition in 1947, Khatri clans, such as Churamani, Nanda, Khullar, Jerath, Chopra and Vig were particularly associated with the city of Ludhiana in Eastern Punjab (today in the Indian state of Punjab (India). But prior 1947 there were some Khullars who belongs to villages Sargoda and Kahna Kacchha Pakistan.

The Khullars are also settled in the cities of Hoshiarpur and Jalandhar for the last three centuries. The Khullars of Basti Guzan in Jalandhar have gone to other places like Haryana, Himachal Pradesh and Delhi due to their government service postings and have settled there. Some have immigrated abroad to Australia, Canada, the United States, the United Kingdom and various parts of Africa in search of jobs and have settled there.

There is a place near ludhiana called village "Bharri". Every year the people there organise a huge fair and all the people from Khullar community go there and pray in front of Khullar's Sati Mata,( Kul Devi). Every year this fair is organised on third day (i.e. on ekadashi) from Krishna Janmashtami i.e. the birth day of Lord Krishna. The Temple of Kul Devi may be reached by rail and road. By rail coming from Ambala side, the nearest railway station is Khanna and from here road transportation is available and it takes hardly 30 minutes to reach the temple. This temple was built in 1469.

Scott Cameron Levi describes Khatris among the "most important merchant communities of early modern India."

See also 
Caste
Sikhism

References 

Religion and castes in Punjab

Social groups of India
Indian surnames
Surnames of Indian origin
Hindu surnames
Khatri clans
Khatri surnames
Punjabi tribes
Punjabi-language surnames